Karina Aguilera Skvirsky is a multidisciplinary artist based in New York, New York. Her work is held in the permanent collections of the Brooklyn Museum, the New York Public Library, the Art Institute of Chicago, and the Whitney Museum, among others. Working across video, performance, and photography, Aguilera Skvirsky addresses themes of migration, colonization, Latin American identity, and family history. Aguilera Skvirsky is best known for her performance video The Perilous Journey of María Rosa Palacios (2019).

Early life and education 
Aguilera Skvirsky was born in Providence, RI to an Ecuadorian mother and a father of Eastern European Jewish descent. As a child, she lived between the Eastern United States and Guayaquil, Ecuador, where her mother was born. Skvirsky has said that the contrast between her memories of Ecuador and her life in the United States was central to her artistic practice.

Aguilera Skvirsky received her Bachelor's degree in Spanish literature from Oberlin College. In 1996, she received an MFA in Photography from Indiana University.

Career 
Aguilera Skvirsky's best known work is The Perilous Journey of María Rosa Palacios, a 30-minute-long video which documents a performance the artist did in 2019. In it, Aguilera Skvirsky retraces the overland journey of her great-grandmother, an Afro-Ecuadorian domestic who travelled to Guayaquil in 1906 before the railroad was completed in 1908. The video was shown in Impermanence: XIII Cuenca Biennial, curated by Dan Cameron, in 2016 and subsequently at Smack Mellon in New York. In 2020, the work was featured in a solo exhibition at Galería Vigil Gonzales, Sacred Valley, Peru.

In 2011, Aguilera Skvirsky participated in a residency at the Laundromat Project in which she collected oral histories of downtown Jersey City through a local laundromat.

In 2017, Aguilera Skvirsky had a solo exhibition entitled The Folds in the Photograph/Los pliegues en la foto at DPM Gallery in Guayaquil, Ecuador.

In 2019, Aguilera Skvirsky received an award from Creative Capital to support the production of a performance-documentary entitled How to build a wall and other ruins as well as Sacred Geometry, a series of photographic collages. These works explore the symbolic power of stone in Inka and Cañari cultures in Ecuador through the ruin site of Ingapirca and contemporary discourse about Latin American colonization and archaeology. How to build a wall and other ruins premiered at the XV Cuenca Biennial, curated by Blanca de la Torre, in Ecuador in late 2021.

Exhibitions 
A selection of other exhibitions of Aguilera Skvirsky's work includes:

 2004 - From the Woolworth; Drawing Room, Jessica Murray Projects, Brooklyn, New York
 2006 - Backyards; curated by Eric Heist, Momenta Art, Brooklyn, New York
 2006 - S-Files; curated by Deborah Cullen and Marysol Nieves, Biennial exhibition, El museo del barrio, New York, Travelled to: Museum of Art of Puerto Rico, San Juan, Puerto Rico
 2007 - 50,000 Beds; The Aldrich Contemporary Art Museum, Ridgefield, Connecticut 
 2007 - Interpreting Utopia; curated by Brian Wallace and Ariel Shanberg, Samuel Dorsky Museum, New Paltz, New York
 2009 - Playlist; curated by Rodolf Kronfle-Chambers and Cristóbal Zapata, Galeria Proceso, Guayaquil, Ecuador
 2010 - Memories of Development; curated by Rodrigo Quijano, La Ex-Culpable, Lima, Peru
 2010 - There is always a cup of sea for man to sail: The 29th São Paulo Biennial; curated by Moacir dos Anjos and Agnaldo Farias, São Paulo, Brazil
 2012 - Southern Exposure; curated by Rodolfo Kronfle-Chambers, DPM Gallery, Guayaquil, Ecuador
 2013 - Bloomfield Avenue Hotline; collaboration with Liselot van der Heijden, Bloomfield College & Montclair Museum of Art, Montclair, New Jersey
 2014 - Proposals for an Ecuadorian Pavilion in Venice; Hansel & Gretel Picture Garden, New York, New York
 2014 - Drones; DPM Gallery, Guayaquil, Ecuador
 2014 - Ready or Not 2014; curated by Shlomit Dror, Newark Museum Newark, New Jersey
 2014 - Mercury Retrograde: Animated Realities; Galerijca Galzenica, Zagreb, Croatia
 2014 - Becoming Male; curated by Erin Lopez-Riley, Freedman Gallery Center for the Arts, Albright College, Reading, Pennsylvania
 2015 - The Daily Grind; curated by Cassandra Getty, Museum London, London, Ontario
 2015 - Contornos: Desenredando el Museo; curated by Eduardo Carrera, Centro de Arte Contemporaneo, Quito, Ecuador
 2015 - Remnants; curated by Fernando Baena, Galeria Proceso, Cuenca, Ecuador
 2015 - Story of a Story; curated by Shlomit Dror, Smack Mellon, Brooklyn, New York
 2016 - Impermanence: XIII Cuenca Biennial; curated by Dan Cameron, Museo Pubapungo, Cuenca, Ecuador
 2016 - Descent; curated by Charlotte Ickes, Institute of Contemporary Art, University of Pennsylvania, Philadelphia, Pennsylvania
 2017 - The Perilous Journey of María Rosa Palacios; curated by Kathleen Gilrain, Smack Mellon Gallery, Brooklyn, New York
 2017 - Where does the future get made?: Lishui Biennial Photography Festival; Lishui Museum of Art, Lishui, China
 2017 - Folds in the Photograph/Los pliegues en la foto; DPM Gallery, Guayaquil, EC
 2017 - Drones; Monmouth University Gallery, Monmouth, New Jersey
 2017 - Exquisite Corpse; curated by Pinyol Ysabel, Mana Contemporary, Miami, Florida
 2017 - Almost home: Between Staying and Leaving a Phantom Land; curated by Shlomit Dror, Dorsky Gallery, Queens, New York
 2017 - Hacia donde Olmedo miraba; curated by Pilar Estrada, Ponce + Robles Gallery, Madrid, Spain
 2018 - Africamericanos; curated by Claudi Carreras, Centro de la Imagen, Mexico City, Mexico, travelled to: Museo Amparo, Puebla, Mexico
 2018 - Horizontes Errantes; curated by Eduardo Carrera, Centro de Arte Contemporáneo, Quito, Ecuador
 2018 - Hybrid Topographies; curated by Monica Espinel, Deutsche Bank, New York, NY
 2019 - Geometría Sagrada / Sacred Geometry; Museo Amparo, Puebla, Mexico
 2019 - Geometría Sagrada / Sacred Geometry; Ponce + Robles Gallery, Madrid, Spain
 2019 - Humboldt: Traspasar El Mito; El Centro Cultural Metropolitano de Quito, Quito, Ecuador     
 2019 - Styling Perspectives; curated by Alli Arnold, Natman Room, John Jay Sharp Building, BAM, Brooklyn, New York
 2019 - Process; curated by Jeffreen Hayes, Handwerker Gallery, Ithaca College, Ithaca, New York
 2019 - where we came from + where we are going; curated by Kimi Kitada, Transformer, Washington, DC
 2020 - Los poemas que declamaba mi Mamá; Backroom, Museo Tamayo, Mexico City, Mexico
 2020 - El Peligroso Viaje de María Rosa Palacios; Galería Vigil Gonzales, Sacred Valley, Peru
 2020 - Sinergia 2.0; Proyecto Nasal, Guayaquil, Ecuador
 2020 - Diálogos, Frieze Online: Geometría Sagrada; curated by Rodrigo Moura and Susanna Temkin, El museo del Barrio, New York
 2020 - Lo que dejamos fuera / What we leave out; Galería Vigil Gonzales, Lima, Peru
 2021 - XV Bienal de Cuenca, Bienal de Bioceno: Cambiar el Verde por Azul; curated by Blanca de la Torre, Museo de la Ciudad, Cuenca, Ecuador
 2021 - Raiz; curated by Eduardo Carrera and Jorge Sanchez, Centro de Arte Contemporáneo, Quito, Ecuador
 2021 - Flash Point; curated by Pilar Estrada, Ponce + Robles Gallery, Madrid, Spain
 2022 - Las piedras están vivas; Ponce + Robles Gallery, Madrid, Spain

References 

Year of birth missing (living people)
Living people